East Laporte Street Footbridge is a historic footbridge located at Plymouth, Marshall County, Indiana.  It was built in 1898 by the Rochester Bridge Company and spans the Yellow River.  It is a two-span, Kingpost truss bridge measuring 100 feet long and 6 feet wide.  The bridge connects a residential area of Plymouth to downtown.

It was listed on the National Register of Historic Places in 1981.

See also
East Laporte Street Footbridge
Marshall County Courthouse (Indiana)
Plymouth Northside Historic District
Plymouth Southside Historic District

References

King post truss bridges in the United States
Bridges on the National Register of Historic Places in Indiana
Bridges completed in 1898
Buildings and structures in Marshall County, Indiana
National Register of Historic Places in Marshall County, Indiana
Pedestrian bridges in the United States
Pedestrian bridges on the National Register of Historic Places